Terrebonne Parish School District is a school district headquartered in Bayou Cane, an unincorporated area in Terrebonne Parish, Louisiana, near Houma. The district serves residents in Terrebonne Parish, including the city of Houma as well as the surrounding unincorporated areas of Bayou Cane, Bourg, Chauvin, Gibson, Gray, Montegut, and Schriever.

Residents of select portions of Lafourche Parish (particularly in parts of Grand Bois and Bourg) may attend schools in the Terrebonne Parish School District. Students with certain medical problems and children of certain teachers residing in Terrebonne Parish may attend school in the Lafourche Parish Public Schools only if superintendents of both systems approve it on a case-by-case basis.

History

The school district made academic improvement between 2015 and 2016; it received a higher score in the Louisiana Department of Education rankings, 95.1 from 90.5; both levels are classified as "B".

School uniforms
The school district requires its PK-12 students to wear school uniforms.

Schools

Elementary schools
Acadian Elementary School (PK-4, Houma)
Bayou Black Elementary School (PK-6, Houma)
Bourg Elementary School (PK-4, Bourg)
Broadmoor Elementary School (PK-6, Houma)
Coteau-Bayou Blue Elementary School (PK-6, Houma)
Dularge Elementary School (PK-6, Houma)
Gibson Elementary School (PK-6, Gibson)
Grand Caillou Elementary School (PK-4, Houma)
Honduras Elementary School (PK-3, Houma)
Legion Park Elementary School (PK-6, Houma)
Lisa Park Elementary School (PK-6, Houma)
Montegut Elementary School (PK-4, Montegut)
Mulberry Elementary School (PK-6, Houma)
Oakshire Elementary School (PK-6, Houma)
Pointe-Aux-Chenes Elementary School (PK-4, Montegut)
Schriever Elementary School (PK-3, Schriever)
Southdown Elementary School (PK-6, Houma)
Upper Little Caillou Elementary School (PK-4, Chauvin)
Village East Elementary School (PK-6, Houma)

Middle schools
Caldwell Middle School (4-6, Schriever)
Grand Caillou Middle School (5-8, Houma)
Lacache Middle School (5-8, Chauvin)
Montegut Middle School (5-8, Montegut)
Oaklawn Middle School (5-8, Houma)

Junior high schools
Evergreen Junior High School (7-8, Houma)
Houma Junior High School (7-8, Houma)

High schools
Ellender Memorial High School (9-12, Houma)
H. L. Bourgeois High School (9-12, Gray)
South Terrebonne High School (9-12, Bourg)
Terrebonne High School (9-12, Houma)
Louis Miller Terrebonne Career and Technical High School (9-12, Houma)

Alternative schools
Bayou Cane Adult Education (Houma)
East Street Alternative School (Houma)
School for Exceptional Children (Houma)

Former schools
Schools for black people:
 Southdown High School (originally Houma Colored High School)

References

External links

 

Houma, Louisiana
School districts in Louisiana
Education in Terrebonne Parish, Louisiana